The lingm (Dzongkha) is a bamboo flute indigenous to Bhutan. The lingm, the dramyin (lute) and the chiwang (fiddle) comprise the basic instrumental inventory for traditional Bhutanese folk music.

There are two varieties of lingm: the dong lingm, which is front-blown; and the zur lingm, which is side-blown.

See also
Music of Bhutan 
Gyaling 
Suona

References

Bhutanese musical instruments
Flutes